Frithjof Henckel (born 27 March 1950) is a German rower. He competed at the 1972 Summer Olympics and the 1976 Summer Olympics.

References

1950 births
Living people
German male rowers
Olympic rowers of West Germany
Rowers at the 1972 Summer Olympics
Rowers at the 1976 Summer Olympics
Rowers from Berlin